A heritage coast is a strip of coastline in England and Wales, the extent of which is defined by agreement between the relevant statutory national agency and the relevant local authority. Such areas are recognised for their natural beauty, wildlife and heritage and amongst the purposes of definition is support for these qualities and enabling enjoyment of them by the public. For England this national agency is Natural England (having formerly been the Countryside Agency) and for Wales it is Natural Resources Wales (which took over the role from its predecessor body, Countryside Council for Wales).

Designated coastline
1,057 km of the English coastline and 495 km of the Welsh coastline, in both cases approximately one-third of the total length, have been defined as heritage coast. The goal is to conserve their natural beauty and improve accessibility for visitors.

Unlike national parks and Areas of Outstanding Natural Beauty (AONBs), the heritage coast designation is non-statutory, and designations can only be made with the agreement of local authorities and landowners. However, the majority of heritage coast falls within statutorily designated landscapes such as national parks, AONBs and the Jurassic Coast World Heritage Site. These coincident designations are listed in the fourth column of the tables below. Designations for nature conservation (as opposed to landscape, e.g. SSSI, Special Area of Conservation and Special Protection Area) of parts of Heritage Coasts are too numerous and complex to easily list here.

The southern coast of Wales and Devon and Cornwall in south west England have more heritage coastline per mile than other regions, including over 50% of the coast between Cardiff and St Davids, about 55-60% of Cornwall's coast, and around 60-65% of Devon's coast. This contrasts with the coasts of North West England, where St Bees Head is the only heritage coast,  or the south-east stretch of the English Channel which has only very sporadic stretches.

The first heritage coast was Beachy Head with its famous white cliffs.

List of heritage coasts

England
Heritage coasts listed clockwise around the English coast from Northumberland:

Wales
Heritage coasts listed clockwise around Welsh coast from southeast:

References

Protected areas of the United Kingdom
Town and country planning in the United Kingdom
Coasts of the United Kingdom
Coasts of England
Coast of Wales